War Sailor is a 2022 Norwegian war drama film directed by Gunnar Vikene. It is based on true stories of Norwegian sailors and their families during and after the Second World War. The film stars Kristoffer Joner, Pål Sverre Hagen and Ine Marie Wilmann. It is Norway's entry for Best International Feature at the 95th Academy Awards.

War Sailor is a co-production of Rohfilm Factory and Studio Hamburg, Germany and Falkun Films, Malta. It is the most expensive Norwegian feature film, with a budget of $11 million.

References

External links 
 

2022 films
2020s Norwegian-language films
World War II films based on actual events
Films shot in Malta
Films set in Norway
2022 drama films